Stictopleurus viridicatus is a species of scentless plant bug in the family Rhopalidae. It is found in North America.

References

Articles created by Qbugbot
Insects described in 1872
Rhopalini